The  is a discourse (Pali: sutta) of Gautama Buddha on the subject of 'blessings' (mangala, also translated as 'good omen' or 'auspices' or 'good fortune').  In this discourse, Gautama Buddha describes 'blessings' that are wholesome personal pursuits or attainments, identified in a progressive manner from the mundane to the ultimate spiritual goal. In Sri Lanka, this sutta considered to be part of "Maha Pirith".

This discourse is recorded in Theravada Buddhism's Pali Canon's Khuddaka Nikaya in two places: in the Khuddakapāṭha (Khp 5), and in the Sutta Nipāta (Sn 2.4).  In the latter source, the discourse is called the Mahāmangala Sutta.  It is also traditionally included in books of 'protection' (paritta). It is also found in the Tibetan Canon, in the Kangyur (བཀའ་འགྱུར།).

Content
The discourse was preached at Jetavana Temple in answer to a question asked by a deva as to which things in this world could truly be considered blessings (mangalāni). The sutta describes thirty-eight blessings in ten sections, as shown in the table below:

Traditional context
The post-canonical Pali Commentary explains that at the time the sutta was preached there was great discussion over the whole of Jambudvipa regarding the definition of blessings. The devas heard the discussion and argued among themselves till the matter spread to the highest Brahmā world. Then it was that Sakka suggested that a deva should visit the Buddha and ask him about it.

This sutta is one of the suttas at the preaching of which countless devas were present and countless beings realized the Truth.

Uses
The sutta is often recited, and forms one of the commonest pieces of chanting used for the Paritta. To have it written down in a book is considered an act of great merit.

History
King Dutugemnu of Anuradhapura preached the Mangala Sutta at the Lohapasada.
 
The preaching of the Mangala Sutta was one of the incidents of the Buddha's life represented in the Relic Chamber of the Ruwanwelisaya.

See also 
 Four Noble Truths
 Metta Sutta
 Paritta - Traditional Buddhist "Protective Scriptures", including Mangala Sutta
 Ratana Sutta
 Sutta Nipata

References

Sources 
 Rhys Davids, T.W. & William Stede (eds.) (1921-5). The Pali Text Society's Pali–English Dictionary. Chipstead: Pali Text Society. A general on-line search engine for the PED is available at http://dsal.uchicago.edu/dictionaries/pali/.

External links 

 Bhikkhu Ānandajoti (trans.). The Discourse on the Blessings (Khp 5).
Bhikkhu Brahmali (trans.) (2015). The Greatest Good Fortune (Sn 2.4).
Thanissaro Bhikkhu (trans.) (1994). Mangala Sutta: Protection (Khp 5). Retrieved from "Access to Insight" on 08-15-2008 at http://www.accesstoinsight.org/tipitaka/kn/khp/khp.1-9.than.html#khp-5.
Life’s Highest Blessings: The Maha-Mangala Sutta: Translation and Commentary by Dr R.L.Soni
A Day of Practice and Discussion, Inspired by the Maṇgala Sutta, by Sharon Salzberg, Barre Center for Buddhist Studies, Spring 2000
Mangala Suta Uannana by Ven. K. Gunaratana Thera (docx- file 69kB)
[* Chandrabodhi chants the Mahamangala Sutta and other suttas in an 'Indian style' at 
and Sangharakshita reads the Mahamangala and Karaniyametta suttas, although with other readings from the Pali Canon at  both retrieved from freebuddhistaudio.com

Khuddaka Nikaya